Stephen Trigg Logan (February 24, 1800 – July 17, 1880) was an American lawyer and politician.

He practiced law with Abraham Lincoln from 1841 to 1843. He served as Illinois circuit court judge and in 1847 was elected to the Illinois Constitutional Convention. He also served in the Illinois House of Representatives. Logan's son, David was a politician in Oregon, serving as mayor of Portland. Stephen Trigg Logan was a close friend and associate of Illinois industrialists and financiers Jacob Bunn and John Whitfield Bunn, who, at Logan's suggestion, helped Logan and others fund the 1860 presidential campaign of Abraham Lincoln.

His maternal grandfather was American pioneer Stephen Trigg and his paternal grandfather was John Logan, who was elected the first treasurer of the state of Kentucky.

His daughter Sally was the second wife of Ward Hill Lamon, another former Lincoln law partner who later served as his primary bodyguard during the Civil War.

References

External links
 

1800 births
1880 deaths
Politicians from Springfield, Illinois
Illinois lawyers
Illinois state court judges
Republican Party members of the Illinois House of Representatives
Abraham Lincoln in Springfield, Illinois